Jarir Marketing Company, also known as Jarir Bookstore, is a Saudi Arabian establishment founded by Abdulrahman Nasser Al-Agil. It was established in Riyadh in 1974 as a small bookshop, which dealt in used books and art sold by expats living in Riyadh, Saudi Arabia. In the 80s, Jarir opened a second branch in Riyadh followed by one in the 90s. In 2003, the company had undergone an initial public offering and a third of its shares is currently traded on Tadawul the Saudi stock exchange. Currently, Jarir has a paid-up capital of SR 1.20 Billion. Jarir’s headquarter is located in Riyadh, Saudi Arabia. Jarir operates through two divisions namely Retail (including online sales), under the trademark of Jarir Bookstore, and a Wholesale division.

Activities 
Jarir is active in the Middle East for trading in Office and School Supplies, Children’s Toys and Educational Aids, Arabic and English Books and Publications, Arts and Crafts Materials, Computer Peripherals and Software, Mobile Phones and Accessories, Audio Visual Instruments, Photography Tools, Smart Television and Maintenance of Computers and Electronic items.

In 2017: Jarir was recognized as the 7th “Most Valuable Retail Brand” in Saudi Arabia (BRANDZ Top 20 Most Valuable Saudi Arabian Brands).

In 2018: Jarir figured in the “Top 100 Listed Companies” in the Arab World (Forbes, Middle East).

Due to the COVID-19 Pandemic Online sales rose six-fold in the second quarter 2020 comparing to previous year.

Branches

Branches:
 Saudi Arabia: 59 stores
 Kuwait: 3 stores
 Qatar: 3 stores
 UAE: 1 stores
 Bahrain : 1 stores

The headquarter is located in Riyadh, Saudi Arabia.

References

1979 establishments in Saudi Arabia
Retail companies established in 1979
Privately held companies
Bookstores of Saudi Arabia
Online retailers of Saudi Arabia
Book selling websites
Book publishing companies
Retail companies of Saudi Arabia